Jean-Marie Landry Asmin Amani (born 15 April 1989 in Achiékoi, Ivory Coast), commonly known as Jean-Marie Amani, is an Ivorian-born French footballer.

Honours
Zimbru Chișinău
Moldovan Cup (1): 2013–14
Moldovan Super Cup (1): 2014

References

External links

Amani at Zimbru website

1989 births
Living people
Ivorian footballers
Association football midfielders
Expatriate footballers in Lithuania
Expatriate footballers in Moldova
FC Zimbru Chișinău players
French footballers
Association football forwards